Sarajevo Cable Car is a cable car in Sarajevo, Bosnia and Herzegovina, connecting the old part of the city with the mountain Trebević.

History

Trebević Cable Car was first built in 1959, and opened for the public on 3 May 1959. It had a capacity of 400 passengers per hour. However, the many years of operation and repairs took a toll on the cable car which resulted in serious problems, so much so that the relevant institutions forbade further repairs of the cable car. Such issues arose in 1977, 1982, 1986, 1987, and in particular on 18 November 1989, when further repairs of the cable car was banned by the Institute "ZRMK" from Ljubljana.

During the Bosnian War (1992–1995), the cable car was completely destroyed.

Reopening in 2018
After closing in 1989, Trebević Cable Car was reconstructed between 2017 and 2018, and officially reopened on 6 April 2018. A total of 33 modern cable cars make up the new system, which can transport up to 1,200 passengers from the city to Trebević per hour, with a ride duration of nine minutes each way.

Mufid Garibija, the designer of the Trebević cable railway station and the starting station, said that the entire lane would be panoramic, and the stations and gondolas would dominate the glass, which would contribute to the enjoyment of visitors in view of Sarajevo. "Gondolas will be in the colors of the Olympic circles and will reflect the unity and multi-ethnicity of Sarajevo," said Garibija.

The cable car has 33 gondolas, of which five are in the colors of the Olympic circles: blue, red, yellow, green and black, one in the colour of the flag of BiH, while the other ones are black.

To announce the cable car's reopening, a promotional song named "Trebević opet silazi u grad" (eng: Trebević is coming to the city again) was officially presented on 23 March 2018. The song was performed by singers Hari Varešanović, Ismeta Dervoz, Zdravko Čolić, and Jasna Gospić, all born in Sarajevo and former members of the band Ambasadori.

See also
Sarajevo Olympic Bobsleigh and Luge Track

References

External links

Transport in Sarajevo
Cable cars in Bosnia and Herzegovina
1959 establishments in Bosnia and Herzegovina